"Don't Threaten Me with a Good Time" is a song by American rock band Panic! at the Disco released as the second promotional single from the band's fifth studio album, Death of a Bachelor, released on December 31, 2015. The song features a sample of "Rock Lobster" by new wave band The B-52's. The song is featured in the NBA 2K18 soundtrack.

Background

"Don't Threaten Me with a Good Time" was announced on New Year's Eve 2015 through Panic! at the Disco's official Twitter account. The video of the audio track was uploaded to Fueled By Ramen's official YouTube channel on the same day of its release. An official music video for the song was uploaded on May 10, 2016. As of December 2022, the music video has surpassed 60 million views.

Charts

Weekly charts

Year-end charts

Certifications

References

External links
 

2015 singles
2015 songs
Fueled by Ramen singles
Panic! at the Disco songs
Song recordings produced by J. R. Rotem
Songs written by Brendon Urie
Songs written by J. R. Rotem
Songs written by Kate Pierson
Songs written by Fred Schneider
Songs written by Keith Strickland
Songs written by Cindy Wilson
Songs written by Jake Sinclair (musician)